Spårvägens FF is a Swedish football club located in Skarpnäck in the southern part of Stockholm.

Background
Spårvägens FF is part of Spårvägens GoIF, a sports club that was founded in 1919 by employees of Stockholm's Spårvägar. The club formed a football section in 1969. Initially their first team fluctuated between third and fifth levels in the Swedish football league system but then played several years in Division 1, the second highest Swedish league. Their clubhouse is located in Skarpnäck in southern Stockholm. Spårvägens FF organises one of Stockholm's largest summer cups for youth teams, the Mini Tiger Cup.

The club currently plays in Division 2 Södra Svealand which is the fourth tier of Swedish football. They play their home matches at the newly constructed artificial turf stadium at Skarpnäcks Sportfält in Skarpnäck, Stockholm.

Spårvägens FF have been working hard to regain their Division 2 status and in both 2009 and 2010 they finished in second place in their section and thus reached the promotion playoffs. On each occasion they were unsuccessful losing to Karlstad BK in 2009 and to FC Gute on aggregate in 2010.

Spårvägens FF are affiliated to the Stockholms Fotbollförbund.

Season to season

* League restructuring in 2006 resulted in a new division being created at Tier 3 and subsequent divisions dropping a level.

Attendances

In recent seasons Spårvägens FF have had the following average attendances:

Notable Managers
  Ranko Đorđić
  Rolf Zetterlund

Footnotes

External links
 Spårvägens FF – Official website

Football clubs in Stockholm
Association football clubs established in 1919
1919 establishments in Sweden